One for the Road is a 2009 French film directed by Philippe Godeau and starring François Cluzet. Based on reporter Hervé Chabalier's autobiography about his battle with alcoholism, the story takes place in a French Alps retreat where Herve (Cluzet) confronts his dangerous addiction. The film received five nominations at the César Awards 2010 with Mélanie Thierry winning Most Promising Actress.

Cast
 François Cluzet as Hervé Chabalier
 Mélanie Thierry as Magali
 Michel Vuillermoz as Pierre
 Anne Consigny as Agnès
 Marilyne Canto as Carol
 Bernard Campan as Marc
 Riton Liebman as Martin

References

External links
Official website

2009 drama films
2009 films
César Award winners
Films about alcoholism
French drama films
2000s French-language films
Pan-Européenne films
StudioCanal films
2009 directorial debut films
2000s French films